The 2000–01 season was the sixth and final season in the history of Canberra Cosmos. It was also the sixth and final season in the National Soccer League.

Players

Competitions

Overview

National Soccer League

League table

Results by round

Matches

Notes:

Statistics

Appearances and goals
Players with no appearances not included in the list.

Clean sheets

References

Canberra Cosmos FC seasons